Abdullah Öcalan has been imprisoned on İmralı Island in the Sea of Marmara since February 1999. He is serving a life sentence for violating article 125 of the Turkish Penal Code. Initially he was sentenced to death but the conviction was commuted to a life sentence in October 2002. Abdullah Öcalans imprisonment and the detention conditions are an issue that constantly causes constraints in the Turkish-Kurdish political sphere which has also an influence on the relations between Turkey and international organizations.

Background 
Abdullah Öcalan is a founder of the Kurdistan Workers' Party (PKK), a militant group which initially aimed for an independent Kurdistan but later adapted their demands towards cultural and political rights for the Kurds. He has led the PKK and its struggle from bases in Lebanon and Syria until he was expelled from Syria in October 1998. Following he toured through several countries in Europe and Africa which all refused to either detain and try him or grant him asylum.

Capture 
Abdullah Öcalan was eventually captured in Nairobi, Kenya by an operative of the Turkish Secret Service in February 1999 and brought to the prison facility on Imrali island. Despite his imprisonment since more than 20 years, Öcalan is still respected and seen as the leader of the PKK by several political actors within Turkey and representatives of the Kurdish diaspora. His calls to lay down arms, to turn themselves in and to hold peace negotiations were often followed by members of the PKK. In the past peace negotiations were also facilitated by the Turkish authorities.

Detention conditions 
Since his capture in February 1999, he has spent several years in solitary confinement on Imralı Island. In November 2009 five other prisoners were brought on the island, on which a new detention facility was built. The new prison was built after the Council of Europe's Committee for the Prevention of Torture (CPT) visited the island and objected to the conditions in which he was being held. Öcalan would be allowed to engage with the other prisoners for ten hours a week was announced by Turkish authorities. In 2014 the European Court of Human Rights (ECHR) ruled in that there was a violation of article 3 in regards of him being to only prisoner on İmralı Island until 17 November 2009.

Detention facility 
In 2010 the CPT has visited Imrali prison and noticed that Öcalan had gained reasonable enhancements in his treatment. He is situated in a cell of about 10m2 with access to a sanitary compound of about 2m2. In the cell there is enough place for a table, chairs, a bed and also a sink. Besides he has access to an outdoor facility of 24m2. The cell lacks of a direct natural light source, which is caused by the 7 meter high wall which surrounds also the outdoor facility. In addition the right to listen to the radio and read newspapers, which he was granted before, he was also provided with a television in January 2013.

Interactions between inmates   
Having been the only inmate until November 2009, today he can choose between taking part in physical activities like table tennis, volley ball, and basketball, which he can play each for one hour per week. Besides he is also allowed to play chess for one hour per week. On Imrali, inmates can meet once a week for a so-called "conversation hour".

Visitation rights 
From 27 July 2011 until 2 May 2019 his lawyers were not allowed to meet Abdullah Öcalan. From July 2011 until December 2017 his lawyers filed more than 700 appeals for visits, but all were rejected. Öcalan was banned from receiving visits almost two years from 6 October 2014 until 11 September 2016, when his brother Mehmet Öcalan visited him for Eid al-Adha. On 6 September 2018 visits from lawyers were banned for six months due to former punishments he received in the years 2005–2009, the fact that the lawyers made their conversations with Ocalan public, and the impression that Öcalan was leading the PKK through communications with his lawyers. He was again banned from receiving visits until 12 January 2019 when his brother was permitted to visit him a second time. His brother said his health was good. The ban on the visitation of his lawyers was lifted in April 2019, and Öcalan saw his lawyers on 2 May 2019.

Political influences 
In 2011, almost a hundred Kurdish mayors were charged with terror propaganda for demanding better detention conditions for Öcalan. Politicians of the pro-Kurdish Peoples Democratic Party (HDP) brought the issue of the solitary confinement several to the Turkish parliament and demanded Öcalan to be allowed to communicate with his relatives and lawyers. During the peace process between the PKK and Turkey Öcalan received visits by politicians of the Peace and Democracy Party (BDP), between January 2013  and March 2013. In support of the peace process, the PKK released six Turkish soldiers and two state employees on orders of Öcalan in March 2013.

Popular campaigns caused by the imprisonment 
After Öcalan's capture, rallies before embassies in several countries were organized. As security guards opened fire at intruders of the Israeli consulate in Berlin, two persons have died. And of seventy-four people which self-immolated themselves in protest of the capture, sixteen have died. There have been held regular demonstrations by the Kurdish community to raise awareness of the isolation of Öcalan. Since at least 2015, rallies demanding the liberation of Abdullah Öcalan are held each February in Strasbourg, the seat of the European Court of Human Rights (ECHR).

Hungerstrikes 
Over 140 Kurdish associations organized hunger strikes in protest of the capture of Öcalan. In later years hunger strikes which demanded an end to the solitary confinement of Abdullah Öcalan. In September 2012 some prisoners began a hunger-strike which with time  involved thousands of prisoners but also politicians of pro Kurdish parties. In November 2012 about 10'000 Kurdish prisoners joined the hunger strike for better detention conditions for Öcalan and the right to use the Kurdish language in trial and the start of peace negotiations between Turkey and the Kurdistan Workers' Party (PKK). It lasted for sixty-eight days until Öcalan demanded its end. Several politicians of the HDP have taken part in hunger strikes demanding an enhancement of the detention conditions. The former HDP MPs Leyla Güven, Sebahat Tuncel and Selma Irmak have also participated in a hunger strike. Leyla Güven ended her hunger strike in May 2019 only after Öcalan was able to receive a visit by his lawyers and called for an end of the hunger strikes.

References 

Imprisonment and detention
Kurdistan Workers' Party
Öcalan family